The 2020–21 season was Dundee United's 112th season. It was their first season back in the Scottish Premiership, having been promoted from the Scottish Championship at the end of the 2019–20 season. United also competed in the League Cup and Scottish Cup.

Season summary
Dundee United were promoted back to the Premiership after the premature season ending due to the COVID-19 pandemic in Scotland and spent majority of summer months fighting their case in the SPFL and ended up in court with Raith Rovers and Cove Rangers fighting their promotions against relegated teams Heart of Midlothian and Partick Thistle. Also in the off-season, manager Robbie Neilson left for Hearts so Micky Mellon was hired as the new manager for United.

Competitions

Results and fixtures

Pre-season and friendlies

Scottish Premiership

Scottish League Cup

Group stage

Scottish Cup

Player statistics

Appearances and goals

|-
|colspan="5"|Players who left the club during the 2020–21 season
|-

|}

League table

League Cup table

Transfers

Players in

Players out

Loans in

Loans out

See also
 List of Dundee United F.C. seasons

Notes

References

Dundee United F.C. seasons
Dundee United